Wilhelm Christian Ottesen Keilhau (30 July 1888 – 9 June 1954) was a Norwegian historian and economist.

Personal life
Keilhau was born in Kristiania to Harald Keilhau and Louise Ottesen. He was married twice, first to Rachel Greiner in 1915, and second time to Rita Wilhelma Steensrud.

Career
He was appointed professor at the University of Oslo from 1934. In addition to his academic career, Keilhau also engaged in other activities. He published two novels and a poetry collection. He was CEO of Norway's first airline company, Det norske Luftfartsrederi, in 1918. During World War II he was a member of the board of directors of the London department of Norges Bank.

References

External links
 

1888 births
1954 deaths
Writers from Oslo
20th-century Norwegian historians
Norwegian economists
Academic staff of the University of Oslo
20th-century Norwegian businesspeople
20th-century Norwegian poets
Norwegian male poets
Norwegian male novelists
20th-century Norwegian novelists
20th-century Norwegian male writers